Pierre Auguste Avaro (15 March 1911 in Port-Gentil–??) was the foreign minister of Gabon in 1964 to 1965.

References

1911 births
Year of death missing
Foreign ministers of Gabon